Linn Meyers (born March 17, 1968) is an American, Washington, D.C.–based artist. Her work has been exhibited in the United States and abroad. She is known for her hand-drawn lines and tracings for site-specific installations.

Early life and travels
Meyers was born in Washington, D.C., where she lived until she was 17, at which time she moved to Paris, France. In 1986 she moved back to the U.S. to attend The Cooper Union in New York City, where she graduated in 1990 with a BFA. In 1991 Meyers moved to Oakland, California, to pursue an MFA at The California College of the Arts in Oakland California (now located in San Francisco.) After completing her master's degree (1993), Meyers returned to New York City. In 1997 she spent several months living and working in New Haven, Connecticut, before relocating to Pittsburgh, Pennsylvania, where she lived for 4 years. Meyers returned to her native Washington, D.C in 2002.

Work
Meyers uses repetitive applications of line and color to draw on a variety of surfaces including paper, vellum, mylar, and gallery walls. "Her drawings tend to grow from themselves, each successive line determining the next." Each piece begins with a single mark – a line that traces a pre-determined framework of circles, or a simple singular gesture.  This first stroke defines the direction in which the entire image will evolve – each line a direct response to the mark made just before.  These marks amass to create an image, which is both still and moving, ordered and chaotic, both pointing toward perfection and also wholly imperfect.

Meyers' works "function like a map of sorts, charting time and space." At the core of the work is the artist's own relationship to time: learning how to move back and forth between natural time, measured time, and subjective time. Meyers has said, “my works are records of a defined period of time, and in that particular way they are not abstract.  They are a form of realism and narrative.” “Indeed Meyers’ work does not erase the artist’s hand; by contrast it is the most direct result of her body movements in a given time period and thereby is a trace of that very personal experience.”

Installation
Meyers has been making large, site-specific wall drawings in museums and galleries since 2000.
These projects require a great deal of endurance and involve drawing in the space over the course of days, sometimes weeks, accumulating lines into dense and intricate compositions. This scale allows Meyers to respond to architectural spaces and magnifies the wholly committed performativity of her process. On Meyers' exhibition for The Hammer Museum, Senior Curator Anne Ellegood wrote, “the sense of being present while viewing the work is also amplified at this larger scale, allowing viewers to experience the work not just visually but also physically. To see a wall drawing is to be surrounded by it and to feel oneself to be part of the work.” Many of Meyers’ wall drawings are created with an awareness of their ultimate impermanence.

As the 2018 halley k. harrisburg ’90 and Michael Rosenfeld Artist-in-Residence at Bowdoin College Museum of Art, Linn Meyers' newest site-specific installation is titled "Let’s Get Lost." In collaboration with an interactive sound installation, "Listening Glass," by Rebecca Bray, James Bigbee Garver, and Josh Knowles, the exhibition will open on September 27, 2018 and remain on view until September 29, 2019. “Her drawn piece will take cues from Listening Glass, using the sound project to inform the composition of her drawing, thus turning sound into drawn gesture.”

Exhibitions
Meyers has exhibited in venues that include the Hammer Museum, Los Angeles; the Phillips Collection, Washington, D.C.; the Smithsonian American Art Museum, Washington D.C.; the Frick Museum, Pittsburgh, Pennsylvania; the Tokyo Metropolitan Museum of Art, Japan; the Mattress Factory, Pittsburgh, Pennsylvania; The Corcoran Gallery of Art, Washington, D.C.; the National Museum of Women in the Arts, Washington, D.C., The Weatherspoon Museum, Greensboro, North Carolina; Paris Concret, Paris, France; the Hirshhorn Museum and Sculpture Garden, Washington, D.C, The Columbus Museum of Art, and the Bowdoin College Museum of Art.

Awards
Meyers has received numerous awards, including a Pollock Krasner Award, a Smithsonian Artist Research Fellowship, A Santo Foundation Individual Artist Award, and four DC Commission on the Arts Fellowships. She has been Artist in Residence at The Hirshhorn Museum and Sculpture Garden, the San Jose Institute of Contemporary Art, The Millay Colony, The Tamarind Institute, The Bemis Institute, the Virginia Center for the Creative Arts, and The Bowdowin College Museum of Art.

Videos
 linn meyers in conversation with Jonathan Frederick Walz, director of curatorial affairs and curator of American art, The Columbus Museum at the National Gallery of Art
 Bowdoin College Museum of Art
 Hirshorn Museum and Sculpture Garden
 Hammer Projects 
 Phillips Collection 
 San Jose Institute of Contemporary Art

Bibliography
 Art In Culture, "혼돈과 질서의 시간" by 김재석, May 14, 2019
 JoongAng Sunday, "점과 선으로 표현한 우주…‘바람의 결’을 그리다" by 정현모, April 13, 2019
 Artsy, "These Women Artists are Transforming Gallery Walls with Incredible Murals" by Alina Cohen, February 29, 2019
 Smithsonian Magazine, "Museum Visitors Can Play This Wall Art Like an Instrument" by Jackie Mansky, December 19, 2018 
 linn meyers: works 2004-2018, Texts by Anne Collins Goodyear, Jonathan Frederick Walz, Co-published with The Columbus Museum, Jason Haam
 Interior Design, "The Hirshhorn’s Famously Round Building is Shaping its Resurgence" by Laura Fisher Kaiser, November 6, 2018
 Alibi, "Breaking the Rules" by Maggie Grimason, February 22, 2018
 Modern Luxury, “Art & Soul”, by Alice Cisternino, December 2017
 BBC News, "The Art Made to be Destroyed," September 28, 2017
 The Washington Post LIVE Facebook Interview with Philip Kennicott, August 11, 2017
 The Washington Post, “Women Now”, by Mark Jenkins, March 24, 2017
 Hyperallergic, "A Visual Artist Creates Lyrical, Linear Poetry," by Seph Rodney, October 20, 2016
 The Washington Post, "A Sweeping Riff on the Circle at the Hirshhorn" by Mark Jenkins, September 3, 2016
 BmoreArt, "A Circle of Lines Fills the Hirshhorn " by Brendan Smith, May 25, 2016
 Smithsonian Mag,"The Mesmerizing Results When a Museum Asks an Artist to Draw Over Its Walls, Anne Glusker, May 24, 2016
 The Washington Times, "Hirshhorn unveils a wall of Meyers artwork" by John Anderson, May 15, 2016
 The Modern Art Notes Podcast, "No. 240, Joel Shapiro, Linn Meyers" by Tyler Green, May 2016
 Artnet.com, "10 Upcoming Shows By Groundbreaking Female Artists" by Cait Munro, March 8, 2016
 Washington CityPaper, "360-Degree Wall Drawing by D.C. Artist Linn Meyers" by Kriston Capps, February 11, 2016
 Intersections @5, published by The Phillips Collection, 2015 
 The Washington Post, "From the Everyday to the Fantastical" by Mark Jenkins, May 29, 2015
 The Intuitionists (catalogue) published by The Drawing Center, NYC, 2015
 Arkansas Times, "12th National Drawing Invitational" by Leslie Newell Peacock, July 15, 2014
 Delmarva Now, "'Blue Study' Highlights 'the beauty of imperfection'" by Ursula Erhardt, April 26, 2014
 The Talbot Spy, "Arts Snapshot: The Lines of Linn Meyers" by Dave Wheelan, March 2014
 The Wall Street Journal, "Narrow, and Very Wide Range" by Peter Plagens, August 31, 2013
 NYC Culture / Style, "Rhapsody: Elena del Rivero & Linn Meyers Art Exhibition" by Miguel Dominguez, August 16, 2013
 Crippen, "Interview with Linn Meyers, Artist" by Susie Crippen, 2013
 NYC Culture / Style, "Rhapsody, Elena del Rivero and Linn Meyers Art Exhibition" by Miguel Dominguez, August 16, 2013
 The Wall Street Journal, "Narrow, and Very Wide, Range" by Peter Plagens, August 31, 2013
 Linn Meyers, Wall Drawings 2007–2011, "Every Now and Again" essay by Anne Ellegood, published by G Fine Art, 2012 
 ArtForum.com, Linn Meyers, The Hammer Museum, by Annie Buckley, September 9, 2011
 Yearbook 2011–2012, "The Hammer Yearbook" by Harrell Fletcher and Adam Moser, published by The Hammer Museum, Los Angeles, pgs 50, 180, 181, 2012
 The Washington Post, "Linn Meyers at G Fine Art" by Kriston Capps, March 11, 2011
 DCist.com, "Linn Meyers @ The Phillips Collection" by Pat Padua, July 30, 2010
 Art Babble, "Hammer Projects: Linn Meyers" 2010
 The Washington Post, "Artist Goes Flat Out to Draw the Viewer In" by Michael O'Sullivan, February 20, 2009
 Artweek, "The Space Between at SJICA" by Frank Cebulski, June 1, 2008
 Art in America, "To A Different Drum" by J.W. Mahoney, May 1, 2008
 The Washington Post, "A Pervasive Thought of Line" December 9, 2007
 The Baltimore Sun, "Drawing Values Meticulous Mark-Making" by Glenn McNatt, January 27, 2007
 Baltimore City Paper, "Interval Affairs" by Deborah McLead, January 24, 2007
 Art on Paper, "New Prints Review" November 1, 2006
 ArtNet.com, "Capital Roundup" by Sydney Lawrence, November 29, 2005
 The Washington Post, "A Bit of the Ocean..." by Jessica Dawson, November 19, 2005
 ArtForum, "Linn Meyers at G Fine Art" by Nord Wennerstrom, November 7, 2005
 Art on Paper, "Linn Meyers: Everything Matters" by Roberta Fallon, June 8, 2005
 ArtCritical.com, "Linn Meyers: Embracing the Unplanned Imperfect" by Vicky Perry, 2005
 Provincetown Magazine, "Portrait of an Artist: Linn Meyers" by B. Thomas, July 24, 2003
 ArtNet.com, "Dotty" by N.F. Karlins, June 1, 2003
 Washington City Paper, "Linn Meyers" by Louis Jacobson, May 16, 2003
 The Washington Post, "Compulsively Quirky" by Jessica Dawson, May 15, 2003
 Pittsburgh Post-Gazette, "Meditative Markings" by Mary Thomas, March 15, 2003
 Art In America, "Linn Meyers at George Billis – New York" by Matthew Guy Nichols, February 1, 2003
 The Philadelphia Inquirer, "Linn Meyers at Gallery Joe" by Edward J. Sozanski, November 29, 2002
 New York Arts, "Linn Meyers at George Billis Gallery" by Deborah Frizzell, June 1, 2002
 Washington City Paper, "87,561 Strokes and Other Works" by Louis Jacobson, September 21, 2001
 The New York Times, "Landscapes of Mind and Nature" by Helen A. Harrison, February 2, 1997

Notes

1968 births
Living people
20th-century American women artists
21st-century American women artists
Artists from Washington, D.C.
California College of the Arts alumni
Cooper Union alumni